Gubin may refer to:
Gubin, Poland, a town on the Polish-German border
Polish and Sorbian name for Guben, a town in Brandenburg, Germany
Gubin, Bosnia and Herzegovina, a village in Bosnia and Herzegovina
Gmina Gubin, a rural administrative district in Lubusz Voivodeship, western Poland
Gubin Coal Mine, a large mine in the west of Poland in Gubin, Lubusz Voivodeship
Gubin Do, a village in the Užice municipality of Serbia

People
Andrey Gubin (born 1974), Russian former pop-singer, poet, composer, and record producer
Aleksandr Gubin (born 1935), Russian cross-country skier
Éliane Gubin (born 1942), Belgian historian, researcher and professor
Oleg Gubin (born April 1981), Russian professional ice hockey forward

See also
Gubino,  several rural localities in Russia

Surnames of Russian origin